Onychomatricoma is a cutaneous condition characterized by a distinctive tumor of the nail matrix.

This nail disease can mimic many nail problems and should be examined and biopsied by a dermatologist.  In particular, a main concern is the malignant and destructive potential that may exist.

See also 
 Nail anatomy
 List of cutaneous conditions
 Nail disease

References 

 

Conditions of the skin appendages